Gary Gauger is a formerly imprisoned convict, who was falsely accused and convicted of the murders of his parents, Morris and Ruth Gauger, and later exonerated. Following the murder on April 8, 1993, Gauger ultimately spent nearly two years in prison and 9 months on death row before being released in March 1996.

Murder and trial
On April 9, 1993, Gary Gauger called the U.S. emergency number 9-1-1 after finding his 74-year-old father's body. Paramedics were summoned, as well as the McHenry County Sheriff's Department, who soon found the body of 70-year-old Ruth Gauger in a trailer on the property.

Gauger told officers he was asleep when his parents were murdered. Despite this, Gauger was interrogated for 21 hours by the police. Officers lied to Gauger and told him that they had found evidence against him. "They told me that they had found bloody clothes in my bedroom; they found a bloody knife in my pocket," he said. After showing Gauger gruesome photographs of his parents, Gauger broke down and confessed. Though Gauger had no memory of the crime, he believed what police had told him. "I thought I must have done it in a blackout," he said. Though he had given a confession, there was no physical evidence held against him in court. Gauger was found guilty of the double murder, and was sentenced to death.

In 2004, two Wisconsin Outlaws Motorcycle Club members, Randall E. Miller and James W. Schneider were charged in the double-murder of Morris and Ruth Gauger.

Exoneration
On March 8, 1996, the Second District Illinois Appellate Court unanimously reversed and remanded the case for a new trial on the ground that Cowlin erred in failing to grant a motion to suppress Gary’s allegedly inculpatory statements. In an unpublished opinion written by Judge S. Louis Rathje, with Judges Robert D. McLaren and Fred A. Geiger concurring, the court held that the statements were the fruit of an arrest made without probable cause and therefore should not have been admitted at the trial.

Without the confession, McHenry County State’s Attorney Gary W. Pack had no choice but to drop the charges, and set Gary free. Pack continued to suggest publicly that Gary had in fact committed the crime and was freed only because the prosecution could not meet its burden of proof without the confession. He was pardoned in 2002 after two motorcycle gang members were ultimately convicted of the crime. Despite this, Pack continues to profess that Gary had committed the crime. Gauger was denied the right to receive compensation for his imprisonment, citing immunity to the police, detectives, and prosecutors.

Post-prison life
Gauger gained national attention following his exoneration, and was featured on The Oprah Winfrey Show,  60 Minutes,  20/20,  Connie Chung Tonight,  A&E Investigative Reports,  and Court TV.

Gauger is one of six people whose stories were dramatized in the acclaimed play The Exonerated, portrayed by Penn Jillette. The play, written by Eric Jensen and Jessica Blank, details how each individual was convicted of murder and sentenced to death, in addition to their exoneration after varying years of imprisonment. The Exonerated is a film adaptation, which first aired on the CourtTV cable television station on January 27, 2005. Gauger is portrayed by Brian Dennehy in the film. At the end of the film it fades from the actor to Gauger himself who talks about his wife, his work and his freedom.

Gauger's story is also featured in 'Deadline', a 2004 documentary on the death row prisoners 

Gauger has since published a memoir of the ordeal entitled In Spite of the System with Julie Von Bergen.

See also
List of wrongful convictions in the United States

References

External links

Living people
Overturned convictions in the United States
Place of birth missing (living people)
Year of birth missing (living people)
False confessions
American people wrongfully convicted of murder
Prisoners sentenced to death by Illinois
American prisoners sentenced to death
People acquitted of murder
People convicted of murder by Illinois